Wiesława Żelaskowska (born 13 September 1964) is a Polish gymnast. She competed in six events at the 1980 Summer Olympics.

References

1964 births
Living people
Polish female artistic gymnasts
Olympic gymnasts of Poland
Gymnasts at the 1980 Summer Olympics
Sportspeople from Olsztyn